Gaudentius (c. 440 in Rome – after 455) was the son of Flavius Aetius. F. M. Clover has argued that his mother was Pelagia, a Gothic noblewoman and the widow of Bonifacius.

He was born in Rome, probably in 440, and was baptized before his first birthday. Scholars identify him as the unnamed subject of a poem of Flavius Merobaudes. In 454 his father and emperor Valentinian III arranged a marriage alliance, which included the marriage between Gaudentius and Placidia, but that year his father was killed by Valentinian himself. In 455, the Vandals sacked Rome; Gaudentius was one of the countless thousands made a prisoner and brought back to Africa. Gaiseric claimed that his following attacks to Italy were to recover Gaudentius's legacy.

Notes

Further reading 
 Arnold Hugh Martin Jones, John Robert Martindale, John Morris, "Gaudentius 7", The Prosopography of the Later Roman Empire, volume 2, Cambridge University Press, 1980, p. 494.

5th-century Romans
440 births
Year of death unknown
Flavius Aetius